Across The Waves  is a football club based in Bundaberg, Queensland. The club was established in 1958. In the 1990s they competed in the Brisbane Premier League under the name "Bundaberg Waves". They currently play in the Wide Bay Premier League competition.

External links
 Official club website

References 

Soccer clubs in Queensland
Brisbane Premier League teams
Association football clubs established in 1958
1958 establishments in Australia